Buldhana is a City and a Municipal Council in the Indian state of Maharashtra . It is the Administrative headquarters of the Buldhana District of Amravati division. It is the Second largest City in the district after Khamgaon and a popular place as a hill station because the city is surrounded by the mountainous area in the Ajanta range.
Buldhana is around 552 km away from the state capital Mumbai

Climate

Demographics
As of the 2011 India census, Buldhana had a population of 67,431. Males constitute 52% of the population and females 48%. Buldhana has an average literacy rate of 82%, higher than the national average of 59.5%, with male literacy at 82% and female literacy at 72%. 13% of the population is under six years of age.

Languages and Culture
The most common language spoken in Buldhana is the Marathi language. More than 98 percent of cities population speak Marathi as first language. Marathi is a compulsory subject taught in English and Hindi Medium school. Hindi is spoken by 1 percent of population. All Hindi speakers in Buldhana can speak fluent Marathi due to its commercial status.

Transport

Roads
Buldhana is well connected to National Highway 6 to other major cities of India through Malkapur town by NH753A and Another National Highway NH753E From Khamgaon To Aurangabad via Buldhana.
There is a Maharashtra State Road Transport Corporation bus stand in the city in Sangam chowk area. buses available to almost every major cities of Maharashtra like Mumbai, Pune,Nagpur,Aurangabad,Nashik,Amravati and other important cities as well as Some nearby cities of Gujarat like Surat and Madhya Pradesh i.e Indore,Khandwa and Burhanpur.

Railways
Railway connection has always been difficult because of the surrounding mountainous area.
Malkapur is the nearest railway station almost 45 km away.

Airport
There have been demands for a domestic airport in Buldhana, as it has several pilgrimage and historical centres such as Shegaon, Sailani, Lonar and Sindkhed Raja.

See also
 Make In Maharashtra

References

 
Talukas in Maharashtra
Cities in Maharashtra